The men's decathlon event at the 2000 Asian Athletics Championships was held in Jakarta, Indonesia on 30–31 August.

Results

References

2000 Asian Athletics Championships
Combined events at the Asian Athletics Championships